Nikita Nguyen (born January 31, 1996) known professionally as Nikita Dragun, is a YouTuber, make-up artist and model.

Early life
Nikita Nguyen was born in Belgium and attended high school in Virginia, United States. She is of Vietnamese and Mexican descent and came out as trans when she was a teenager. In several of Nguyen's YouTube videos, she has spoken openly about her gender identity.

Career
Nguyen joined YouTube in February 2013. She stated, "I started to get little brand deals around that time… That was also when I decided to start taking Instagram and YouTube seriously." In 2015, by which time she was living in Los Angeles, she came out as transgender. As of October 2021, she has over 3.54 million subscribers on YouTube, 9 million followers on Instagram, and 14.5 million followers on TikTok.

In response to comments by L Brands chief marketing officer Ed Razek that trans women should not be included in the Victoria's Secret Fashion Show because "the show is a fantasy", Nguyen tweeted a video of herself modeling lingerie. In the tweet, Nguyen argues that trans women were indeed able to convey fantasy.

In March 2019, she announced a make-up line, Dragun Beauty. Aside from the mainstream market, the cosmetic line is also targeted towards the transgender community. All products are vegan and cruelty-free, this is cited as a reason why Nikita decided to launch her brand independently. In June 2019, Nguyen was interviewed about her make-up brand on the LGBT radio network Channel Q, where she credited her journey as a trans woman building her brand as the inspiration behind Dragun Beauty and its products.

In September 2019, it was announced Nikita would be starring in her own docuseries on Snapchat, "Nikita Unfiltered". The series follows Nguyen as she searches for love, "a different path" in her career, and navigates fame as a trans woman. The series premiered on March 21, 2020.

Controversies
On July 21, 2020, Nguyen held a surprise birthday party for YouTuber Larri Merritt during the COVID-19 pandemic at the Hype House mansion. The party included internet celebrities such as James Charles, Charli D'Amelio, Dixie D'Amelio, and others. At the time of the party, California's COVID-19 cases had just surpassed New York's cases. There was an estimated 67 people in attendance, many of whom were seen without face masks despite local health recommendations. Photos and videos of the event appeared on social media sites such as Instagram. These posts drew criticism from the public, including other influencers like Elijah Daniel and Tyler Oakley. Merritt, and some of the other attendees, later apologized. Residents of the Hype House later tested negative for COVID-19. 

Some people have accused Nguyen of blackfishing.

Arrest
Nguyen was arrested on November 7, 2022, after police claimed they found her roaming around a swimming pool at The Goodtime Hotel in Miami Beach, Florida, wearing only underwear and spraying police and security personnel with water. According to the police report, officers were called in response to a report of a person acting in a "highly disorderly fashion" and causing a disturbance. She was charged for misdemeanor disorderly conduct, misdemeanor battery, and felony battery on a police officer. Nguyen was taken into custody at the Turner Guilford Knight Correctional Center in Miami-Dade County with a $2,000 bond. She claimed she was placed into a men's prison despite her gender identity. Officials from the Miami-Dade Corrections & Rehabilitation Department disputed Nguyen's account, saying during Nguyen's booking process she was first held in an open seating area, then in a one-person holding cell.

Awards

Filmography

Web series

TV series

Music videos

References

External links

1996 births
Living people
LGBT people from Virginia
Belgian YouTubers
American YouTubers
LGBT YouTubers
Transgender female models
LGBT media personalities
Shorty Award winners
Hispanic and Latino American models
Hispanic and Latino American entertainers
Streamy Award winners
20th-century LGBT people
21st-century LGBT people
Belgian emigrants to the United States
Belgian people of Vietnamese descent
Belgian people of Mexican descent
American people of Vietnamese descent
American people of Mexican descent